Ab Bazan is a village located on the right side of the Kokcha River in Afghanistan. It is about 15 miles north of Kalafghan and about 20 miles northwest of Keshem. It is located in Rustaq District.

See also
Takhar Province

References

Populated places in Takhar Province
Villages in Afghanistan